Muthathi (or Muttatti) is a settlement situated on the banks of the Kaveri river near Malavalli in the Indian state of Karnataka. It is surrounded by a dense forest which is the home of the Kaveri Wildlife Sanctuary. The location has mythological associations with Sita (the wife of Rama) and Anjaneya (a Hindu deity/god), and there is a small temple dedicated to Anjaneya near the town. This well connected hilly place is accessible from Bangalore through direct bus/private vehicles. Kannada matinee idol Dr. Rajkumar was named Muthuraja after the temple deity of this place - Muthathiraya (Hanuman).

Gallery

References

External links

 

Forests of India
Cities and towns in Mandya district
Places in the Ramayana